Terry Paice (born 22 February 1953) is a Canadian wrestler. He competed in the men's freestyle 90 kg at the 1976 Summer Olympics.

References

1953 births
Living people
Canadian male sport wrestlers
Olympic wrestlers of Canada
Wrestlers at the 1976 Summer Olympics
People from Whitewood, Saskatchewan
Commonwealth Games gold medallists for Canada
Commonwealth Games medallists in wrestling
Pan American Games medalists in wrestling
Pan American Games bronze medalists for Canada
Wrestlers at the 1975 Pan American Games
Medalists at the 1975 Pan American Games
Wrestlers at the 1974 British Commonwealth Games
20th-century Canadian people
Medallists at the 1974 British Commonwealth Games